Porayath Leela (19 May 1934 – 31 October 2005) was an Indian playback singer, Carnatic vocalist and a music director. She has recorded more than 5,000 songs in various Indian languages including Malayalam, Telugu, Tamil, Kannada, Hindi, Bengali, Sanskrit, Odia, Gujarati, Marati. and also Sinhale. She is also known for her extensive history of collaboration in the songs with Music Composers V Dakshinamoorthy., MS Baburaj, G Devarajan, Ghantasala, MS Viswanathan , K. Raghavan, Br Lakshmanan, LPR Varma, BA Chithambara athletes, AT Ummer, MK Arjun,Johnson, Ouseppachan, Ilaiyaraja, and with the playback singers KJ Yesudas and Ghantalasa over the years. Leela is known for her sweet and melodious voice that she named Ganamani. She was awarded Padma Bhushan in 2006. She made her debut as a playback singer in the 1948 Tamil film Kangkanam.

Early life
Leela was born in 1934, in Chittur, Palakkad, Kerala to V.K. Kunjanmenon and Porayath Meenakshi Amma. She was the youngest of the three daughters – Sharadha, Bhanumathi and Leela. V K Kunjanmenon was a teacher in Ramavarma Higher Secondary School at Ernakulam. Her father wanted her and her sisters to learn Carnatic music, and she states that her father was the reason she became a singer.

Starting at the age of 13, she has sung about 5000 film songs in all the South Indian languages – Tamil, Telugu, Malayalam and Kannada. She also sang for a Bengali film and in Sinhala movies. Her songs are known for their emotional touch and classical discipline. She made a name for herself by singing both in film industry and in Carnatic music. She considered it an honor to have sung in the same period as M S Subbulakshmi, M L Vasanthakumari and D K Pattammal – three giants of Carnatic Music. She has worked under all great music directors and has sung with all the major singers of the South Indian film industry.

Career
Leela's first guru was Thiribuvana Manibhagavadhar, the uncle of musician T. V. Gopalakrishnan. Later she learnt from Paththamadai Krishna Ayyar, Maruthuvakudi Rajagopala Iyer and Rama Bhagavathar. Leela was trained in Carnatic music by doyens such as Chembai Vaidyanatha Bhagavathar and V. Dakshinamoorthy. Vadakkancheri Ramabhagavadhar was a close friend of Menon. He had settled down in Madras. He would invite Menon and Leela to Madras to learn music whenever he visited Ernakulam. The headmistress of the school where Leela was studying advised her father to take her to Madras for further training in music.

It was Menon's ambition to make his youngest daughter an accomplished singer. Menon resigned his job in Ernakulam and took Leela to Madras in 1944. They stayed with Vadakkancheri Ramabagavathar in Mylapore and the 10-year-old Leela started learning in gurukula style. Her father was particular that Leela do sadhaka (practice music) early in the morning.

In Madras, Leela had opportunities to listen concerts of singers like Ariyakudi Ramanuja Iyengar, S. Ramanathan, G. N. Balasubramaniam, Chembai and others. Leela said this 'kelvi gnanam' (learning music by listening) helped her much in fine-tuning music and molding her. Leela sang at many music competitions in the city winning prizes in 1946. Durgabai Deshmukh gave her the first concert at Andra Mahila Sabha. Leela was giving concerts in various places.

Entry into film industry 
Columbia Recording Company was looking for a female voice and the manager Ganabathirama Iyer recommended Leela. She was appointed as their artiste. This paved the way for her entry into films.

In Tamil, Nandakumar was the first movie to introduce playback singing. A.V. Meiyappa Chettiar came up with the innovative idea of replacing the soundtrack with voice and the playback system was introduced in Tamil cinema in 1938. It gradually got acceptance and many singers entered the movie world.

When she landed in Madras she did not know Tamil or Telugu. She used to write the song in Malayalam and practice them to perfection. Once she started her career as playback singer she arranged tutors and learnt other languages.

She got her first offer to sing in 1948 for a Tamil movie. Her father was initially reluctant but later he was persuaded to accept. Leela made her debut as playback singer in the movie Kanganam. She sang her first song, Sree Varalakshmi..., when she was just 13 years old. C.H. Padmanabhasastry was the music director of the film. She sang all the songs for the heroine in that film. After her debut in Kanganam, for two decades and more she was the most sought-after playback singer in South Indian Cinema.

In 1948, she sang Paaduka Poonkuyile for the Malayalam movie Nirmala, though Balan, made in 1938, was the first Malayalam "talkie" with a sound track. Balan was produced by T.R Sundaram for Modern Theatres, Salem, with S. Nottani as the director.

Telugu movies 
In 1949, Leela made her debut in Telugu Cinema singing in three films: Manadesam, Keelu Gurram and Gunasundari Katha. Singer and music director Ghantasala (with whom Leela has sung the most songs) introduced Leela in Manadesam. She sang all the songs for the heroine in the film Gunasundari Katha.

In the 1950s Leela was busy singing in all the South Indian languages. Vijaya productions' first movie, Shavukaru, did not fare well at the box office.

She sang in the film Missamma (made as Missiyamma in Tamil), and worked as a music director for a film called 'Chinnari Papalu' (Telugu) in 1968. The film was produced exclusively by women. She sang eight songs along with P. Susheela in the film Lava Kusa (1963).

Discography
Main article List of songs by P. Leela

 Sampoorna Ramayanam (1971)
 Paramanandayya Shishyula Katha (1966)
 Tirupathamma Katha (1963)
 Mahamantri Timmarasu (1962)
 Gundamma Katha (1962)
 Dakshayagnam (1962)
 Sri Seetha Rama Kalyanam (1961)
 Deepavali (1960)
 Sahasra Siracheda Apoorva Chinthamani (1960)
 Sri Venkateswara Mahatyam (1960)
 Krishna Leelalu (1959)
 Pelli Sandadi (1959)
 Mangalya Balam (1958)
 Dongallo Dora (1957)
 Panduranga Mahatyam (1957)
 Preme Daivam (1957)
 Sarangadhara (1957)
 Bhakta Markandeya (1956)
 Bhale Ramudu (1956)
 Jayam Manade (1956)
 Anarkali (1955)
 Vadina Gari Gajulu (1955)
 Vaddante Dabbu (1954)
 Oka Talli Pillalu (1953)
 Palletooru (1952)
 Pelli Chesi Choodu (1952)
 Patala Bhairavi (1951)
 Navvite Navaratnalu (1951)
 Paramanandayya Shishyula Katha (1950)

Personal life 
Leela married a lawyer, but the marriage was not successful. In her later years, Leela was busy rendering classical concerts and light music programs. Leela was staying with her sister's children in Defence colony, St. Thomas Mount (Parangimalai).

Legacy, Singing style
She was known for her ability to sing both classical and light, film music also her emotional touch and classical discipline she imparted. It can be well explained by her song in the film Chilamboli, Priyamanasa née composed by V Dakshinamoorthy and sung by her.

On her death, the Chief Minister of Tamil Nadu, Jayalalitha said

Awards and recognition

1.Civilian Honours by Government of India

She was awarded Padma Bhushan posthumously for her contributions in the year 2006.

Tamil Nadu State Honour
She was conferred with the Kalaimamani title in 1992 by Chief Minister J Jayalalithaa

Kerala State Awards
Leela received the best playback singer award of the Kerala government in 1969 for the song Ujjayiniyile Gaayika from the movie Kadalpalam.

She received a Certificate of Honour for the Growth and Developments of Malayalam Films by Kerala Government.

Other awards
Janmashtami Puraskaram instituted by Balasamskara Kendram for her efforts in spreading 'Narayaniyam', 'Jnanappana' and 'Harinamakeerthanam. 
 Kerala Sangeetha Nataka Akademi Award for Best Classical Musician (1983).
 Kamukara Awards
 Thyagaraja Bhagavthar special awards by Tamil Nadu government
Madras Music Academy Gold Medal
 Swaralaya Kairali Yesudas Special Jury Awards
Film fans awards
Life achievement awards by the sangam kala group-hero honda  
Sivapadmam Award
Swathi Ratna award and Title by Malayali club Madras for propagating Swathi Thirunal krithis
Vayalar Memorial Cultural Award 1997" by Kala Kairali and Vayalar Memorial Cultural Award Academy.
Malayalam Cine Technicians Association (MACTA) honorary membership.

Titles 
Leela has been conferred with many titles like ''ganamani'', ''ganakokila'', ''kalarathnam'' and ''ganavarshini'',
1 Curnool - Thyagaraja Sangeetha Sabha - "Ganamathi"
2. Anbathur - Maunaswamigal - "Sangeetha Hamsani"
3. Guntur - Guntur Cultural Academy - "Ganakokila" 4. Chennai - St. Thomas Arts Academy - "Sangeetha Saraswathi" 5. Trivandrum - Trivandrum Devaswom Board - "Kalaratnam" 6. Newyork - Kannada Kota & Tamil Sangam - "Gana Varshini" 7. Guruvayoor - Venkatachalapathi Temple - "Nada Sudha" 8. Guruvayoor - Sangeerthana Trust - "Bakthi Gana Thilakam" 9. Arni - Sri Thyagaraja Sabha - "Irai Isai Mamani" 10. Guruvayoor - Guruvayoor Temple - "Sangeetha Narayani"

Death 
P. Leela died on 31 October 2005, at 00:40 IST at Sri Ramachandra Medical Centre in Chennai. She was hospitalized in late September after suffering serious injuries sustained due to a fall at the bathroom in her home. Though she was operated on, her condition suddenly worsened due to pneumonia, probably a complication of asthma she suffered for a long time, and she went into a deep coma a day before she died. She was cremated with full state honours the same day at Besant Negar Crematorium.

Memorial

An open stage named Thiruvarangu was built in 2018 at her native place Chittur-Tathamangalam in her memory.

References

External links
 
 

1934 births
2005 deaths
Indian women playback singers
Singers from Kerala
Tamil playback singers
Malayalam playback singers
Kannada playback singers
Recipients of the Padma Bhushan in arts
People from Palakkad district
20th-century Indian singers
Film musicians from Kerala
Women musicians from Kerala
20th-century Indian women singers
Recipients of the Kerala Sangeetha Nataka Akademi Award